Jorge Adrián Sosa Reyna (born July 16, 1968, in Durango City, Durango), known as Jorge Sosa, is a Mexican football manager and former player.

Career
Born in Durango, Sosa made his Primera División debut with C.F. Pachuca in 1996. He would later help Club Irapuato win the Primera "A" during the 2002–03 season, and then return to the Primera División with Irapuato during 2003.

References

External links
 

1968 births
Living people
Mexican footballers
Mexican football managers
Liga MX players
Ascenso MX players
C.F. Pachuca players
Irapuato F.C. footballers
Alacranes de Durango footballers
Footballers from Durango
People from Durango City
Association footballers not categorized by position